John Fisher Burns (born 4 October 1944) is a British journalist, and the winner of two Pulitzer Prizes. He was the London bureau chief for The New York Times, where he covered international issues until March 2015. Burns also frequently appears on PBS. He has been called "the dean of American foreign correspondents."

Life and career
From 1998 to 1999, he was a visiting fellow at King's College, Cambridge, studying Islamic history and culture.
He also speaks French and German.  His father was a South African who served in the Royal Air Force.

In the early 1970s, Burns wrote for The Globe and Mail of Canada, as a local and later parliamentary reporter. During this stint, Burns completed a master's in political science at McGill University. He was sent to China in 1971 to be one of a few Western journalists in China during the Cultural Revolution, after a confusion that led to his brief ban from the precincts of the Parliament of Canada by the Commons Speaker. Burns joined The New York Times in 1975, reporting, at first, for the paper's metropolitan section, and has written ever since for the newspaper in various capacities.

He has been assigned to and headed several of the Times foreign bureaus. He and fellow Times journalists John Darnton and Michael T. Kaufman won the 1978 George Polk Award for foreign reporting for coverage of Africa. Burns was the Times bureau chief in Moscow from 1981-84. In 1986, while chief of the Times Beijing bureau, Burns was incarcerated on suspicion of espionage by the Chinese government. Charges were dropped after an investigation, but Burns was subsequently expelled from the country.

Burns was awarded the 1993 Pulitzer Prize for International Reporting citing "his courageous and thorough coverage of the destruction of Sarajevo and the barbarous killings in the war in Bosnia-Herzegovina".

In the early to mid-1990s, Burns headed the New York Times' bureau in New Delhi, with responsibility for the Indian Subcontinent and adjoining regions, from Afghanistan to Burma.  He and his family resided in New Delhi though Burns was frequently on the road, travelling regularly to Kabul, Islamabad, Dhaka, Colombo and Kathmandu. He actively covered events in Afghanistan, which led to his second Pulitzer in 1997, this time "For his courageous and insightful coverage of the harrowing regime imposed on Afghanistan by the Taliban".  Burns was based in Baghdad during the lead up to the Iraq war in 2003 and has written extensively on the war and the subsequent occupation. In July 2007, Burns succeeded Alan Cowell as bureau chief in London. On 30 September 2007, Burns received the Elijah Parish Lovejoy Award as well as an honorary Doctor of Laws degree from Colby College.

In an October 2008 interview with the Russian Ambassador to Afghanistan, Zamir Kabulov, Burns accused Kabulov of being a KGB operative.

Burns is a frequent contributor to PBS, including a number of appearances on the Charlie Rose show and The NewsHour with Jim Lehrer via satellite from Afghanistan and Iraq. In a January 2009 interview, Michael Barone called Burns "one of the great foreign correspondents of our time". In an August 2010 interview with Charlie Rose, Christopher Hitchens, while recounting a tour of Sarajevo guided by Burns in which they were fired upon, called Burns "the greatest war correspondent of our time".

On 26 March 2015, The New York Times announced that an article about the burial of Richard III would conclude Burns' career at the New York Times.

Personal life
Burns married Jane Peque Gnat in 1972. The couple divorced in 1989. In 1991, Burns married Jane Scott-Long, who manages the New York Times Baghdad bureau. Burns has two children from his first marriage, Jamie and Emily, and one stepchild, Toby, from his second marriage.

References

External links

Interviews
Video: John Burns Interviewed by Bill Maher, 10 March 2006
Transcript: John Burns interviewed by Hugh Hewitt, 9 February 2007
C-SPAN Q&A interview with Burns, 11 February 2007
C-SPAN Q&A interview with Burns, 5 December 2010
Video: John Burns presentation and Q&A with Ralph Begleiter at the University of Delaware, 8 April 2009

1944 births
Living people
McGill University alumni
Pulitzer Prize for International Reporting winners
George Polk Award recipients
British war correspondents
The New York Times Pulitzer Prize winners
English male journalists
Elijah Parish Lovejoy Award recipients
Harvard University alumni
English male non-fiction writers
Alumni of the University of Cambridge